Lord Edmund Howard ( – 19 March 1539) was the third son of Thomas Howard, 2nd Duke of Norfolk, and his first wife, Elizabeth Tilney.  His sister, Elizabeth, was the mother of Henry VIII's second wife, Anne Boleyn, and he was the father of the king's fifth wife, Catherine Howard.  His first cousin, Margery Wentworth, was the mother of Henry's third wife, Jane Seymour.

Family
Edmund Howard, born about 1478, was the third son of Thomas Howard, later 2nd Duke of Norfolk, and his first wife, Elizabeth Tilney. He had seven brothers and two sisters of the whole blood: Thomas Howard, 3rd Duke of Norfolk, Edward Howard, Sir John Howard, Henry Howard, Charles Howard, Henry Howard, Richard Howard, Elizabeth Howard, and Muriel Howard, who married firstly, John Grey, 2nd Viscount Lisle, and secondly, Sir Thomas Knyvet.

By his father's second marriage to Agnes Tilney, Howard had seven half-brothers and sisters: John Howard, John Howard, William Howard, 1st Baron Howard of Effingham, Charles Howard, Sir Thomas Howard, Henry Howard, Richard Howard, Anne Howard, Dorothy Howard, who married Edward Stanley, 3rd Earl of Derby, Katherine Howard, who married firstly Rhys ap Griffith and secondly Henry Daubeney, 1st Earl of Bridgewater, and Elizabeth Howard, who married Henry Radclyffe, 2nd Earl of Sussex.

Career
Howard spent his early years at court, and in 1509 he was listed as one of the noblemen who organized the jousts for the joint coronation of Henry VIII and his first wife, Catherine of Aragon. Although his eldest brother, Thomas Howard, 3rd Duke of Norfolk, became a dominant figure at court, and another brother, Edward Howard, was a close companion of the King, Edmund appears not to have shared the King's favour and seems to have been considered ineffectual.

Biographers have described Howard as 'a spendthrift who soon dissipated his first wife's lands in Kent and Hampshire and fled abroad to avoid his creditors, leaving his numerous children to be brought up by relatives'.

Howard was Marshal of the Horse at the Battle of Flodden on 9 September 1513, and attended the King at the Field of the Cloth of Gold in 1520, where he was one of the challengers in the tournaments. In 1530 or 1531, with the assistance of Thomas Cromwell, Howard was made Controller of Calais.  He was dismissed from the post in 1539, possibly due to ill health after many years of ineffectual service, where he achieved very little, and earned even less.

Howard died on 19 March 1539, a year before his daughter, Catherine Howard, became queen of England. His widow, Margaret, was among the ladies appointed to serve her stepdaughter when her household was formed in August 1540. Margaret later married Henry Manock. Although Steinman conjectured that Margaret Mundy's third husband was the Henry Manox, who had been music master to Catherine Howard in her youth, and had been involved in sexual indiscretions with her which later contributed to her downfall, Bindoff established that Margaret Mundy's third husband, Henry Manock, made his will on 18 March 1564, in which he disinherited both Margaret and his son. Margaret (née Mundy) was buried at Streatham, Surrey, on 22 January 1565.

Marriages and issue
Howard married firstly Joyce Culpeper (c.1480 – c.1531), widow of Ralph Leigh (d. 6 November 1509) of Stockwell (in Lambeth), Surrey, and daughter of Richard Culpeper, esquire, of Oxenhoath, West Peckham, Kent. By her first marriage, Joyce Culpeper had two sons and three daughters who were thus Howard's stepchildren:

Sir John Leigh (d.1566), who married a wife named Elizabeth, and by her had a daughter, Agnes Leigh (d. before 1590), who married firstly, Sir Thomas Paston (c. 1515 – 4 September 1550), a gentleman of King Henry VIII's Privy Chamber, the fourth but third surviving son of Sir William Paston (c. 1479 – 1554) and Bridget Heydon, and secondly, Edward Fitzgerald, (17 January 1528 – 1597), a younger brother of Gerald FitzGerald, 11th Earl of Kildare (1525–1585).
Ralph Leigh (d. before 1563), who married Margaret Ireland, the daughter of William Ireland, esquire, and by her had a son,
John Leigh, esquire, who married Margery Saunders, and a daughter,
 Frances, who married Edward Morgan.
Isabel Leigh, who married firstly, Sir Edward Baynton, secondly, Sir James Stumpe, and thirdly, Thomas Stafford, esquire.
Joyce Leigh, who married John Stanney, esquire.
Margaret Leigh, who married a husband surnamed Rice.

Howard and Joyce Culpeper had three sons and three daughters:
Henry Howard, esquire.
Sir Charles Howard
Sir George Howard (c.1525–1575)
Margaret Howard (c.1515–10 October 1572), who married Sir Thomas Arundell of Wardour Castle, and had issue
 Sir Matthew Arundell 
 Charles Arundell 
Catherine Howard (c. 1524–13 February 1542), who married Henry VIII and had no issue.
Mary Howard, who married Edmund Trafford.

Howard married secondly, Dorothy Troyes, daughter of Thomas Troyes of Hampshire, and widow of Sir William Uvedale (d.1529).

Howard married thirdly, before 12 July 1537, Margaret Mundy (or Munday), daughter of Sir John Mundy (or Munday), Lord Mayor of London, and widow of Nicholas Jennings. Howard had no issue by his second and third wives.

Notes

References

Bibliography

External links
Sir George Howard (c. 1519 – 1580), History of Parliament
Mannock, Henry (by 1526–64), of London; Haddenham, Cambridgeshire; and Hemingford Grey, Huntingdonshire, History of Parliament Retrieved 7 July 2013
Agnes Leigh in Emerson, Kathy Lynn, A Who's Who of Tudor Women
Edward Fitzgerald

Edmund
Howard, Lord Edmund
Howard, Lord Edmund
Howard, Lord Edmund
16th-century English soldiers